Omar Bryan (born 7 December 1984) is a Caymanian cricketer. He played in the 2014 ICC World Cricket League Division Five tournament.

References

External links
 

1984 births
Living people
Caymanian cricketers
Place of birth missing (living people)